Collèges de France is a French international school in Antananarivo, Madagascar.

It serves preschool through senior high school as well as professional levels.

It has three campuses: , Ankadilalana, and Ambohijatovo. The Ankadilalana campus serves all grade levels.

It was formerly Collège de France.

See also 
 French people in Madagascar

References

External links
 Collèges de France 

Antananarivo
Elementary and primary schools in Madagascar
French international schools in Madagascar
International high schools
High schools and secondary schools in Madagascar